Dracula syndactyla is a species of orchid.

References 

syndactyla